Dimitri Shevardnadze (December 1, 1885 – 1937) was a Georgian painter, art collector and intellectual purged during Joseph Stalin's repressions.

Life
Born in Bakhvi, a small village in the western Georgian province of Guria, then part of the Russian Empire, he was educated at the art academies of St Petersburg and Munich. Upon his return to Georgia, he founded, in 1916, and led the Association of Georgian Artists. He helped also to establish the  National Gallery of Fine Arts (1920) and the Tbilisi State Academy of Arts (1922). He decorated several opera and theatre performances, and movies, and designed an official logo of the Tbilisi State University.

Revolt
In 1937, the Communist chief of Georgia, Lavrentiy Beria, intended to destroy the medieval Metekhi church in Tbilisi, but met stubborn opposition from a group of Georgian intellectuals led by Dimitri Shevardnadze. Beria replied to their urges, that it would surely be enough to preserve a scale model of the church so that people could see it in a museum, and then told Shevardnadze privately that if he gave up his efforts to save the church he would be appointed director of the future museum. The artist refused and was eventually imprisoned and executed. The church was preserved, however.

Family
Georgian politician Eduard Shevardnadze was a son of a cousin of Dmitri Shevardnadze.

References

External links 

D. Shevardnadze
The Georgian Museum of Photography

1885 births
1937 deaths
Great Purge victims from Georgia (country)
People from Guria
People from Kutais Governorate
20th-century painters from Georgia (country)
Tbilisi State Academy of Arts